Windwhistle Peak is a square sandstone peak south of Punchbowl Cirque in the Allan Hills, Oates Land. Reconnoitered by the New Zealand Antarctic Research Program (NZARP) Allan Hills Expedition (1964) which so named the peak because of the peculiar behavior of the wind in its vicinity.

Mountains of Oates Land